Nicholas D'Virgilio (born November 12, 1968), often abbreviated and referred to as NDV, is an American drummer, singer and guitarist, best known as a member of the progressive rock band Spock's Beard. He was also one of two drummers chosen to replace Phil Collins in Genesis on the Calling All Stations album. He has also done session work with many artists including Tears for Fears and Mystery, and is an official member of Big Big Train.

Career
D'Virgilio was the drummer in Spock's Beard since the band began in the early 1990s. After Neal Morse left in 2002, D'Virgilio took over on lead vocals and became their frontman during live performances. In this line-up, Spock's Beard subsequently recorded four albums, Feel Euphoria, Octane, the self-titled Spock's Beard, and X, prior to D'Virgilio's departure in 2011.

In 1994, D'Virgilio joined Kevin Gilbert's reformed band Giraffe for a one-off performance of the Genesis piece "The Lamb Lies Down on Broadway" at Progfest '94. In 1995, he performed drums as part of Gilbert's touring band, Thud, which recorded a live album, Live at the Troubadour, released in 1999. After Gilbert's death in 1996, D'Virgilio was asked by Gilbert's estate to complete his second solo album, The Shaming of the True, based on the extant tapes and Gilbert's notes. Shaming was released posthumously in 2000 and has D'Virgilio on many tracks contributing drums, percussion, bass, guitar, keyboards and backing vocals. In November 2002, D'Virgilio headlined Progwest in Claremont, California and played the entire The Shaming of the True album live in a band consisting of other friends and colleagues of Gilbert's. In 2008, video tapes of the Troubadour concert were uncovered for the first time, leading to a DVD, entitled Welcome to Joytown – Thud Live at The Troubadour, released in 2009.

A lifelong fan of the progressive rock band Genesis, D'Virgilio was given an opportunity by the band to replace Phil Collins on drums for their 1997 album Calling All Stations. D'Virgilio split percussion duties with Nir Zidkyahu during work on the album.

D'Virgilio had been a full member of the Mike Keneally Band from 2001 to 2004, playing on the tour supporting Keneally's 2000 album Dancing and later providing drums and vocals on the 2004 album Dog, as can be seen on the DVD included as part of the Dog Special Edition in both live as well as "making-of" studio footage. Previous Keneally drummer Joe Travers took D'Virgilio's place in the band for the subsequent Guitar Therapy tour.

D'Virgilio's first solo album, Karma, was recorded in 2001 at Kevin Gilbert's former studio, Lawnmower and Garden Supplies Studio, in Pasadena. The album included performances by Mike Keneally and Bryan Beller, D'Virgilio's bandmates in The Mike Keneally Band. D'Virgilio also served as the chief engineer on Beller's solo album View, recorded at the same studio as Karma.

D'Virgilio filled in for Mark Zonder on Fates Warning's summer tour with Dream Theater and Queensrÿche in 2003. Zonder's prior commitments prevented him from taking part in the tour, and he ceased performing with the band following its 2005 release FWX due to a reported aversion to touring. D'Virgilio played with the band on a handful of gigs supporting that album and appeared on the 2006 DVD release Live in Athens. D'Virgilio also appeared on Jordan Rudess' 2007 album The Road Home.

After guesting on three tracks on Big Big Train's 2007 album The Difference Machine, he was billed as a "permanent guest" on The Underfall Yard (2009) and subsequently joined the band as a full member, appearing on the 2010 EP Far Skies Deep Time, English Electric Part One (2012), English Electric Part Two (2013), the Wassail EP (2015), and most recently Folklore (2016), Grimspound (2017), The Second Brightest Star (2017) and Grand Tour (2019).

On July 26, 2011, D'Virgilio released a solo EP called Pieces. He performed a show in Quebec City, Canada performing the EP in its entirety with local musicians on the day of the album release.

On November 18, 2011, D'Virgilio announced that he had left Spock's Beard, because of his work with Cirque du Soleil, "It is very hard for me to write this, but as all good things come to an end at sometime or another, unfortunately I have to tell you all that my time with Spock's Beard has come to a close."

In early 2014, D'Virgilio appeared on Strattman's album The Lie of the Beholder stating: "Recording the drums for Roy's record was a total blast. I am really honored that he asked me to be a part of his new musical adventure. The record rocks and, from a drummer's perspective, I got to hit 'em hard and got challenged by the songs – 2 things drummers love. I really enjoyed the whole process and the music."

Later in 2014, D'Virgilio left Cirque du Soleil due to show cutbacks and joined Sweetwater Sound in August as a drum ambassador "where he creates how-to content, demonstration videos, and product reviews. He also teaches music and pro audio classes and serves as the Sweetwater Studios' first-call session drummer."

In July 2016, D'Virgilio and Neal Morse joined Spock's Beard for the only two performances of the album Snow, first at Morsefest on July 2 and then for Night of the Prog, in Loreley, Germany on July 15.

In August 2016, rock trio The Fringe released its self-titled debut album, featuring D'Virgilio on drums and vocals, Jonas Reingold of The Flower Kings on bass, and Randy McStine (Lo-Fi Resistance) on vocals and guitars.

In 2018, it was announced that D'Virgilio had returned to Spock's Beard as their recording drummer following the departure of Jimmy Keegan. He appears on their 13th studio release, Noise Floor. It remains unclear whether D'Virgilio will continue recording with the band, which has designated Mike Thorne (previously of Saga) as their live drummer.

In 2020, D'Virgilio released his first solo album in nine years, Invisible. The album was recorded at Sweetwater Sound with the string and brass sections recorded at Abbey Road Studios. D'Virgilio wrote the concept during his time in the booth while touring with the Cirque Du Soleil show Totem.

In 2023, it was announced that he would be performing as the drummer for Mr. Big on their "BIG Finish Tour".

Personal life
D'Virgilio lives in Fort Wayne, Indiana with his wife Tiffany and his two children Anthony and Sophia.

Discography

Solo albums
Karma (2001)
Pieces (EP) (2011)
Invisible (2020)

With Spock's Beard

Studio albums

The Light (1995)
Beware of Darkness (1996)
The Kindness of Strangers (1998)
Day for Night (1999)
V (2000)
Snow (2002)
Feel Euphoria (2003)
Octane (2005)
Spock's Beard (2006)
X (2010)Noise Floor (2018)

Live albumsOfficial Live Bootleg/The Beard Is out There (1996, recorded 1995)Live at the Whisky and NEARfest (1999)Don't Try This at Home (April 2000, recorded 1999)Nick 'n Neal live in Europe - Two Separate Gorillas (October 2000) (From the Vaults, Series 2)
 Don't Try This @ Home Either (2000, recorded 1999) (From the Vaults, Series 3)There and Here (2000) (live – From the Vaults, Series 4)The Beard Is Out There-Live (2003)Gluttons for Punishment (2005)Live (2008)Snow Live (2017, recorded 2016)

With Big Big TrainThe Difference Machine (2007)The Underfall Yard (2009)Far Skies Deep Time (2010)English Electric Part One (2012)English Electric Part Two (2013)Make Some Noise (2013)English Electric: Full Power (2013)Wassail (2015)Folklore (2016)Grimspound (2017)The Second Brightest Star (2017)Grand Tour (2019)Common Ground (2021)Welcome to the Planet (2022)

With The FringeThe Fringe (2016)

Other collaborationsCalling All Stations (1997) (with Genesis)Tomcats Screaming Outside (2001) (with Roland Orzabal)The Kaviar Sessions (2002) (with Kaviar)A Fair Forgery of Pink Floyd (2003) (Astronomy Domine) (with Mike Keneally Band)Dog (2004) (with Mike Keneally Band)Live in Athens (2005) (with Fates Warning)Secret World Live in Paris (2006) (Tears For Fears) Voice in The Light (2007) (with Amaran's Plight)A Tribute to the Lamb Lies Down on Broadway (2008) (with Rewiring Genesis)The Old Road (2008) (with Martin Orford)The Face of the Unknown (2010) (with Aeon Zen)The Philadelphia Experiment (2010) (with Frost*)The World Is a Game (2012) (with Mystery)The Man Left in Space (2013) (with Cosmograf)Capacitor (2014) (with Cosmograf)The Lie of the Beholder (2014) (with Strattman)New World (2014) (with Dave Kerzner)The Unreasonable Silence (2016) (with Cosmograf)The Dreaming Street (2016) (with The Dreaming Street)Essential Blues (2017) (with Carl Verheyen)Jesus Christ The Exorcist (2019) (with Neal Morse)At the Edge of Light (2019) (with Steve Hackett)Troika'' (2022) (with Neal Morse and Ross Jennings)

References

External links

Nick D'Virgilio Interview NAMM Oral History Library (2018)

1968 births
Living people
Genesis (band) members
Musicians from Whittier, California
American rock drummers
Spock's Beard members
Mirage (British band) members
20th-century American drummers
American male drummers